The 1979 South Dakota Coyotes football team represented the University of South Dakotaas a member of the North Central Conference (NCC) during the 1979 NCAA Division II football season. Led by first-year head coach Dave Triplett, the Coyotes compiled an overall record of 5–6 with a mark of 3–3 in conference play, tying for fourth place in the NCC. South Dakota and  played two head-to-head games, both won by the Jackrabbits, which counted as one loss for South Dakota and one win for South Dakota State in the conference standings.

Schedule

References

South Dakota
South Dakota Coyotes football seasons
South Dakota Coyotes football